Indira Priyadharsini Law College is a private law school situated beside Anjaiah Road in Ongole city of Prakasam district in the Indian state of Andhra Pradesh. The law school offers 3 years LL.B., five-years integrated B.A, LL.B. courses approved by the Bar Council of India (BCI), New Delhi and affiliated to Acharya Nagarjuna University. This Law institute was established in 1991 in the name of former Prime Minister of India Smt. Indira Gandhi.

References

Law schools in Andhra Pradesh
Universities and colleges in Andhra Pradesh
Educational institutions established in 1991
1991 establishments in Andhra Pradesh
Monuments and memorials to Indira Gandhi